Togo National Museum is the national museum of Togo. It is located in the capital of Lomé.

Founded in 1975, it presents cultural and historical exhibits.

The museum showcases artifacts dating back to thousands of years, including musical instruments such as the Xalam, baskets decorated with shells and calabashes used to preserve food and water, clay pots, wood carvings, clothes, metalwork, and tobacco pipes.

References

Museums in Togo
Museums established in 1975
Buildings and structures in Lomé
National museums
1975 establishments in Togo